is a railway station on the Tadami Line in the town of Aizubange, Fukushima Prefecture, Japan, operated by East Japan Railway Company (JR East).

Lines

Station layout
Wakamiya Station has one side platform serving a single bi-directional track. The station is unattended. There is no station building, but only a shelter built onto the platform.

History
Operations were suspended from Jule 10, 1945 to June 10, 1946. The station was absorbed into the JR East network upon the privatization of the JNR on April 1, 1987.

Surrounding area
Aizu-Bange Wakamiya Elementary School

See also
 List of railway stations in Japan

References

External links

 JR East station information 

Railway stations in Fukushima Prefecture
Tadami Line
Railway stations in Japan opened in 1934
Stations of East Japan Railway Company
Aizubange, Fukushima